Cherninia is an extinct genus of mastodonsaurid temnospondyl. The type species, Cherninia denwai, is known from the Denwa Formation of India. It is based on a massive skull, ISI A 54, which was originally considered a species of Parotosuchus in 1998 before being given its own genus in 2001.

Another species, Cherninia megarhina, is known from the Upper Ntawere Formation of Zambia. C. megarhina is based on another large skull, BP/1/4223, which had also been previously referred to Parotosuchus. Though not as well-preserved as the skull of C. denwai, BP/1/4233 was described earlier in 1974. It was described by Sharon Chernin, a paleontologist at the Bernard Price Institute and the namesake of the genus.

References

Prehistoric amphibians of Africa
Triassic temnospondyls of Asia
Prehistoric amphibians of Asia
Fossil taxa described in 2001
Prehistoric amphibian genera